The Progressive Conservative Party of Manitoba fielded a full slate of 57 candidates in the 1988 provincial election, and won 25 seats to form a minority government.  Many of the party's candidates have their own biography pages; information about others may be found here.

Allan Yap (Burrows)

Yap was the sales manager for a prominent insurance company, and was involved in the Malaysia Singapore Association of Manitoba.  He first campaigned for the Manitoba legislature in the 1981 provincial election at age forty, as a candidate of the Progressive Party.

He is not to be confused with the Vancouver businessman of the same name.

Footnotes

1988